In applied mathematics, the Wiener–Khinchin theorem or Wiener–Khintchine theorem, also known as the Wiener–Khinchin–Einstein theorem or the Khinchin–Kolmogorov theorem, states that the autocorrelation function of a wide-sense-stationary random process has a spectral decomposition given by the power spectrum of that process.

History
Norbert Wiener proved this theorem for the case of a deterministic function in 1930; Aleksandr Khinchin later formulated an analogous result for stationary stochastic processes and published that probabilistic analogue in 1934.  Albert Einstein explained, without proofs, the idea in a brief two-page memo in 1914.

The case of a continuous-time process
For continuous time, the Wiener–Khinchin theorem says that if  is a wide-sense stochastic process whose autocorrelation function (sometimes called autocovariance) defined in terms of statistical expected value,  (the asterisk denotes complex conjugate, and of course it can be omitted if the random process is real-valued), exists and is finite at every lag , then there exists a monotone function  in the frequency domain  such that

where the integral is a Riemann–Stieltjes integral. This is a kind of spectral decomposition of the auto-correlation function.  F is called the power spectral distribution function and is a statistical distribution function.  It is sometimes called the integrated spectrum.

The Fourier transform of  does not exist in general, because stochastic random functions are not generally either square-integrable or absolutely integrable.  Nor is  assumed to be absolutely integrable, so it need not have a Fourier transform either.

But if  is  absolutely continuous, for example, if the process is purely indeterministic, then  is differentiable almost everywhere. Because the left and right derivatives of  exist everywhere, we can put  everywhere, (obtaining that F is the integral of its averaged derivative), and the theorem simplifies to

If now one assumes that r and S satisfy the necessary conditions for Fourier inversion to be valid, the Wiener–Khinchin theorem takes the simple form of saying that r and S are a Fourier-transform pair, and

The case of a discrete-time process
For the discrete-time case, the power spectral density of the function with discrete values  is 

Provided  is absolutely integrable, i.e.

 

the result of the theorem then writes

Being a sampled and discrete-time sequence, the spectral density is periodic in the frequency domain. This is due to the problem of aliasing: the contribution of any frequency higher than the Nyquist frequency seems to be equal to that of its alias between 0 and 1.

Application
The theorem is useful for analyzing linear time-invariant systems (LTI systems) when the inputs and outputs are not square-integrable, so their Fourier transforms do not exist.  A corollary is that the Fourier transform of the autocorrelation function of the output of an LTI system is equal to the product of the Fourier transform of the autocorrelation function of the input of the system times the squared magnitude of the Fourier transform of the system impulse response. This works even when the Fourier transforms of the input and output signals do not exist because these signals are not square-integrable, so the system inputs and outputs cannot be directly related by the Fourier transform of the impulse response.

Since the Fourier transform of the autocorrelation function of a signal is the power spectrum of the signal, this corollary is equivalent to saying that the power spectrum of the output is equal to the power spectrum of the input times the energy transfer function.

This corollary is used in the parametric method for power spectrum estimation.

Discrepancies in terminology

In many textbooks and in much of the technical literature it is tacitly assumed that Fourier inversion of the autocorrelation function and the power spectral density is valid, and the Wiener–Khinchin theorem is stated, very simply, as if it said that the Fourier transform of the autocorrelation function was equal to the power spectral density, ignoring all questions of convergence (Einstein is an example).
But the theorem (as stated here) was applied by Norbert Wiener and Aleksandr Khinchin to the sample functions (signals) of wide-sense-stationary random processes, signals whose Fourier transforms do not exist.
The whole point of Wiener's contribution was to make sense of the spectral decomposition of the autocorrelation function of a sample function of a wide-sense-stationary random process even when the integrals for the Fourier transform and Fourier inversion do not make sense.

Further complicating the issue is that the discrete Fourier transform always exists for digital, finite-length sequences, meaning that the theorem can be blindly applied to calculate auto-correlations of numerical sequences. As mentioned earlier, the relation of this discrete sampled data to a mathematical model is often misleading, and related errors can show up as a divergence when the sequence length is modified.

References

Further reading

 (a classified document written for the Dept. of War in 1943).

Theorems in Fourier analysis
Signal processing
Probability theorems